Wang Hsing-hao (born 5 June 1999) is a Taiwanese swimmer. In 2019, he represented Chinese Taipei at the 2019 World Aquatics Championships held in Gwangju, South Korea.

In 2018, he represented Chinese Taipei at the 2018 Asian Games held in Jakarta, Indonesia. He competed in the men's 200 metre individual medley and men's 400 metre individual medley events. He also competed in the men's 4 × 200 metre freestyle relay event.

In 2019, he won the bronze medal in the men's 200 metre individual medley event at the 2019 Summer Universiade in Naples, Italy.

References

External links 
 

Living people
1999 births
Taiwanese male swimmers
Male medley swimmers
Swimmers at the 2018 Asian Games
Asian Games competitors for Chinese Taipei
Universiade medalists in swimming
Universiade bronze medalists for Chinese Taipei
Medalists at the 2019 Summer Universiade
Swimmers at the 2020 Summer Olympics
Olympic swimmers of Taiwan